The St. Joseph's Chapel in Minto, North Dakota, United States, includes Stick/Eastlake, Colonial Revival, and Late Gothic Revival architecture.  It was built in 1907.  It was listed on the National Register of Historic Places in 1994.

It is a wayside shrine, exemplifying that type of Polish immigrant construction.

References

Colonial Revival architecture in North Dakota
Gothic Revival church buildings in North Dakota
Queen Anne architecture in North Dakota
Polish-American culture in North Dakota
Churches on the National Register of Historic Places in North Dakota
Roman Catholic churches completed in 1907
Churches in the Roman Catholic Diocese of Fargo
National Register of Historic Places in Walsh County, North Dakota
Roman Catholic chapels in the United States
1907 establishments in North Dakota
20th-century Roman Catholic church buildings in the United States
Stick-Eastlake architecture in the United States